Artanes may refer to:

 Artanes (Bithynia), a town of ancient Bithynia
 Ancient city of Artanes, modern Lom, Bulgaria
 Artanes dynasty, a dynasty of the ancient Kingdom of Sophene

See also
 Artane (disambiguation)